Luke Carter (born 21 June 1960) is a New Zealand sailor. He competed in the Flying Dutchman event at the 1984 Summer Olympics.

References

External links
 

1960 births
Living people
New Zealand male sailors (sport)
Olympic sailors of New Zealand
Sailors at the 1984 Summer Olympics – Flying Dutchman
Sportspeople from Wellington City